Molod Ukrayiny is a Ukrainian newspaper published daily in Kyiv. It is a Ukrainian language newspaper and the Ukrainian analogue of Komsomolskaya Pravda. Until 1934 it was located in Kharkiv. Since fall of the Soviet Union the newspapers are privately owned.

History
In 1921, the newspaper "News of the Central Committee of the Communist Youth Union of Ukraine" was published in Kharkiv. In 1922, it was renamed the Molodoi Rabotnik, which was published twice a week in Russian.

In January 1924 (January 6–27), the newspaper was renamed Molodoi Leninets. The newspaper was published 3 times a week, the publisher was the Central and Kharkiv Committee of the LKSMU. In 1925, a literary edition appeared.

In 1925–1943, it was known as Komsomolets Ukrayiny. 155 issues were published in Kharkiv till 1934. Since 1925 it was published by the state publisher Radyanska Ukrayina (Pressa Ukrayiny since 1991).

In 1934, Kyiv became the capital of Ukraine and Komsomolets Ukrainy moved to Kyiv.

In 2011, Molod Ukrayiny refused services of its original publisher and began to be published independently.

In 1969–1990, it was awarded annually the Ukrainian Footballer of the Year to players who played for the Ukrainian clubs in the Soviet football competitions. Also it was awarded annually the Ruby Cup for the best scoring team in the Football Championship of the Ukrainian SSR.

The newspaper was awarded three orders: the Order of the Patriotic War, the Order of Friendship of Peoples and the Order of the Red Banner of Labour.

Authors 
Over the years of its existence, many publicists, writers and poets were involved into the work of Molod Ukrayiny: Vasyl Symonenko, Maksym Rylsky, Andriy Malyshko, Mykola Vingranovsky, Borys Oliynyk, Vitaliy Korotych, Ivan Drach, Ivan Dziuba, Yevhen Sverstyuk, Vasyl Stus, Stanislav Telnyuk, Ivan Svitlychny, Serhiy Grabovsky, Anatoliy Matviychuk, Viktor Maza.

See also
 Ukrayina Moloda

References

External links
Ukrayinsky futbol official website 
Vereyitin, D. Serhiy Bondarenko: Hryhoriy Surkis did not intervene in "Nash Futbol", yet Anatoliy Popov I last saw 3 or 3.5 years ago. MarchDay. 29 August 2015

Daily newspapers published in Ukraine
Publications established in 1925
Ukrainian-language newspapers
Mass media in Kyiv
1925 establishments in Ukraine